Alphonso Hodge (born May 30, 1982) is a former professional American and Canadian football defensive back. He was originally drafted by the Kansas City Chiefs of the National Football League in the fifth-round (147th overall) of the 2005 NFL Draft.

Hodge also played for the New York Jets, Cleveland Gladiators and Toronto Argonauts.

Early years
Hodge was a three-year letterman in football and an all-state selection as a senior at St. Edward High School in Lakewood, Ohio.

College career
Hodge was a four-year letterman at Miami University in Ohio, where he appeared in 46 games with 35 starts, including starts in his final 27 games. He recorded 147 tackles (103 solo), including 10 tackles for losses (-51.0 yards), eight sacks, three fumble recoveries and 24 passes defensed.

He started all 13 games in his senior season for the Redhawks, where he recorded 52 tackles (41 solo), 2.0 tackles for losses (-3.0 yards), 5.0 sacks (-31.0 yards) and six passes defensed. Hodge earned first-team All-MAC honors by The NFL Draft Report as a senior. In his junior year, Hodge received second-team All-MAC honors after recording 47 tackles (27 solo), 1.0 sack (-3.0 yards), three fumble recoveries and nine passes defensed.

Professional career

National Football League
Hodge was selected in the fifth round (147th overall) of the 2005 NFL Draft by the Kansas City Chiefs. He spent time with the Chiefs (2005–2006) and with the New York Jets (2006).

Arena Football League
On April 8, 2008, Hodge was signed to the practice squad of the Cleveland Gladiators of the Arena Football League. Then, on April 17, 2008, he was called up to the active roster. He then made his arena football debut on April 19, 2008 against the Los Angeles Avengers.

Canadian Football League
The Toronto Argonauts signed him on February 25, 2009 and released him on November 22, 2010.

Notes

External links
Toronto Argonauts bio

1982 births
Living people
Players of Canadian football from Cleveland
Players of American football from Cleveland
St. Edward High School (Lakewood, Ohio) alumni
American football cornerbacks
Canadian football defensive backs
American players of Canadian football
Miami RedHawks football players
Kansas City Chiefs players
New York Jets players
Cleveland Gladiators players
Toronto Argonauts players
Kansas City Renegades players